The WWP World Cruiserweight Championship is a professional wrestling championship in the South African Professional wrestling promotion World Wrestling Professionals, contested exclusively among Cruiserweight (<) wrestlers. It was created on November 1, 2007, during WWP Thunderstrike's third televised season.

Title history

See also
World Wrestling Professionals

References

External links
Official World Wrestling Professionals Website

World Wrestling Professionals championships
World professional wrestling championships
Cruiserweight wrestling championships